The West Stanley Pit disasters refers to two explosions at the West Stanley colliery (variously known as West Stanley pit or Burns pit). West Stanley colliery was a coal mine near Stanley, with the mine opening in 1832 and closing in 1936.  Over the years several seams were worked through four shafts: Kettledrum pit, Lamp pit, Mary pit and New pit.  In 1882 an underground explosion killed 13 men and in 1909 another explosion killed 168 men.

The colliery 
There were a number of seams, some of which were too thin to be economically worked. The seams which were worked in 1876 and 1909 were: Shield Row (6'11" at 39 fathoms), Five Quarter (4'0" at 52½ fathoms), Brass Thill (5'0" at 62 fathoms), Low Main (4'6" at 93 fathoms), Hutton (3'9" at 97 fathoms), Towneley (4'5" at 123 fathoms), Busty (10'1" at 139 fathoms) and Brockwell (2'0" at 163 fathoms).

Two of the pits: Busty pit (also known as the New pit) and the Lamp shaft were sunk the full distance.  Before 1882 they had both reached the Busty coal.  Between then and 1902 they were deepened to reach the Brockwell seam.  Subsequently, the Busty shaft was further deepened to reach the Victoria coal (2'1" at 170 fathoms) but this coal was only worked for the last few years of the mine's life.  The other two pits (Kettledrum and Mary) were the first pits and were only sunk to the Hutton seam.  Unaccountably Morley claims only one of these pits reached the Hutton coal, the other stopped short at the Shield Row.  The Durham Mining Museum states both reached the Hutton coal, supported by documents from the North of England Institute of Mining & Mechanical Engineers.  Since 1862 collieries have been required by law to have at least two pits reaching any seams being worked, see Hartley Colliery disaster.

The Busty pit was the downcast pit, that is the pit down which air passes to ventilate the workings.  The Lamp pit was the upcast pit, that is the one up which the air passes.  At the time of both disasters the ventilation was by induced draft provided by 30 (later 35) foot diameter fan.  Coal was drawn up the Busty shaft from the Busty and Hutton seams in 1882.  By 1909 only the Busty level was serviced directly: coal was lowered down a staple from the Towneley and down a drift from the Tilley.  Because mechanical ventilation was used (rather than the earlier furnace system), coal could be drawn up the upcast.  In 1882 the Low Main and Shield Row coals were serviced by the Lamp shaft, in 1909 only the Brockwell coal was raised this way.

Firedamp
Mines in which there was a significant amount of firedamp came into the category of "fiery mines" and had special rules applied to mitigate the danger.  In 1882 the then manager (William Johnson) would not admit that West Stanley was a fiery mine, however the rules applicable to such a mine were in force.  The official enquiry states that "the presence of gas had been reported frequently during the four or five months before the explosion".  In the 1909 report firedamp "had only been reported once during the present year [1909]".

1882 disaster
The 1882 explosion occurred at 1a.m. on the morning of 19 April. It was localised in the Busty seam. From the shafts major passages known as "headways" radiated off north, south and west. Each headway gave access to a district. From the north and south headways other passageways were driven: the north and south cross-cuts. Each of these led to a sub-district. The explosion occurred within the north cross-cut district where two men had been working. From the position of the men and their food, they appeared to have been taking a food break. A large stone measuring "from 4 to 5 yards long, 2 feet broad, and from 10 inches to a foot in thickness" (approximately 4m x 0.6m x 28 cm) had fallen from the roof. The report concluded that this fall released a large quantity of firedamp which had been under pressure within the cavity. The inspector was unable to decide which of two things then happened: either that the outrush of gas was sufficient to blow the flame through the gauze of one of their safety lamps, or that as the men started to move away from the fall they snatched up their lamps causing a sufficient air current to pass the flame.

There had been indications of a large quantity of gas in the area; not only had it already been detected but also hissing and bubbling sounds had been heard.  There had also been a heaving of the floor and fissures had been seen.  The lamps in use were Clanny lamps which were known to pass the flame in a moderate current.  The owner had tried to introduce Mueseler lamps (which withstand a greater current of air) but the men had resisted them since they gave a poorer light.  The six lamps found near the seat of the explosion were tested.  All passed, but some were slightly damaged and three were unlocked.

The inspector reported that the mine management was somewhat deficient.  No certified copy of the rules could be found, one of the deputies was illiterate so could not have read and enforced the rules, reports were not made in the correct books, licenses for men who were permitted to carry lamp keys and fire shots were not issued, the barometer and thermometer records were not correctly kept.  However, in his final remarks Morley accepted that on this occasion the management deficiencies did not contribute to the disaster.

1909 disaster 
The 1909 explosion occurred at 3:45p.m. on 16 February.  By 2a.m. the downcast shaft was available for rescue parties to descend.  They entered the Townely and Busty seams, and from thence went into the Tilley seam.  In the latter they found and brought out 26 men.  From the Townley seam four men were found, but one died from the effects of afterdamp after 30 hours.  Eventually another 165 bodies were retrieved, two were unaccounted for when the search was called off.  In 1933 later workings broke into the Busty seam and two skeletons were discovered.  They were identified as the missing men.

Before the explosion
By this date a significant amount of electricity was being used underground.  Two electrically driven coal cutting machines were used in the Townley seam and one each in the Tilley and Brockwell seams.  The largest motors underground were the  pump in the Busty seam near to the Busty shaft and the  haulage motor in the Townley seam.  There were also two smaller 25 horsepower motors and three 5 horsepower motors elsewhere in the colliery.  To power this a 40 Hz 550 volt 150 amp three phase generator was installed on the surface which delivered the power through insulated (but unarmoured) cables down the Busty shaft.

As well as the motors, there were a few incandescent lamps around the shafts.  All other illumination was from Marsaut and Donald type safety lamps.  The lamps were lit and locked on the surface, and if extinguished had to be sent back to the surface for relighting.  However, following the discovery in 1933 of the two skeletons an inquest was held (as required by law).  At this inquest J B Atkinson attempted to present fresh evidence that another type of lamp was in use.  This was the Howart's Patent Deflector lamp which was larger than the standard lamps.  As a result of the increased volume the lamp was unsafe; an explosion inside would be large enough to pass through the gauze and ignite the surrounding atmosphere.  The coroner allowed him to read the statement, but the jury were directed to disregard it in their determination of the identity and cause of death.

Other preventative measures were watering, control of shot firing and inspections.  Watering to keep coal dust damp was performed regularly, however the inspector cast doubt upon its effectiveness having observed pools of water next to dry dust.  Shot firing to bring down stone and, in some seams, coal appears to have been tightly controlled.  Inspections on behalf of the men were meant to be carried out every three months.  The reports from January 1909 could not be produced.  Those from September 1908 were produced and were all satisfactory.

The Explosion
Five minutes before the explosion the man in charge of the large pump in the Busty seam advised the generator house that he was about to start the pump.  This was normal procedure.  Five minutes later there was a "burring" noise from the generators indicating an electrical overload, followed by two of the three (one per phase) fuses blowing.  Smoke issued from the downcast shaft, in other words moving against the air flow, followed fifty seconds later by a fireball and cloud of smoke.  A few moments later the cloud was sucked back down the downcast shaft as the air circulation re-established.

Both main shafts were damaged by the explosion.  The downcast (Busty) shaft suffered damage all the way to the surface, and then the casing between the pit top and the heapstead was blown down.  The upcast (lamp) pit also suffered damage, but fortunately the fan was uninjured and continued to run.  Before the district inspector could arrive the shaftmen had already started to clear away the debris from the downshaft.  A temporary hospital was established at the pithead.  Medical and rescue stores were brought in and by 2a.m. the cages could be lowered down the pit.  The men mentioned above were brought up, but there were no further survivors.  Recovery and exploration work went on "unceasingly" until 6 days after the explosion all but two of the bodies had been recovered and brought up.  The search for these two (the ones found in 1933) was abandoned due to increasing danger to the recovery parties.

Investigation
The first step in investigating a colliery explosion is to determine where the explosion occurred.  In the case of West Stanley the official report states "in no case that we [ie Redmayne and Bain] have investigated has it been more perplexing than the one under consideration".  The first thought was that the seat of the explosion might have been in or near the engine house in the Towneley seam, but further investigation rendered this unlikely.  The Brockwell seam was next considered.  There was evidence of some burning; this being the only place in the mine where it was observed.  No cause of ignition, accumulation of gas or the presence of a blower was found.  Further damage to the props and the separation door indicated that the explosion had swept into the seam ("inbye") before sweeping out ("outbye").

There was no damage to the Tilley seam and the men working there had been saved, so it was not considered further.  The only seam left was the Busty coal.  The onsetter, Matthew Elliott, was the only man to have survived from the Busty seam and his evidence is quoted at length.  Critically the electric lights went out at the time the explosion was heard ("Yes, it was instantaneous"), some time before the cloud was observed by a safety lamp.  Two mining engineers who had arrived at 8p.m. following the explosion were cross examined and agreed that the explosion occurred in the Busty seam and was due to a coal dust.  Neither could say how the dust was ignited.

The inquiry then considered how the coal dust might have been ignited.  Four possibilities were considered: Open lights (lamps or matches), shot firing, sparking from friction and electricity.  No evidence of faulty lights or contraband was found (though there remains the question of the Howart's Patent Deflector reported at the 1933 inquiry).  All shots were accounted for and every shot hole inspected; none was fired at the time or shortly before the explosion.  Friction from tubs (coal wagons) against the rails or following a derailment was considered and dismissed.

Electricity was then considered.  The fuses within the mine did not blow, but evidence from the colliery electrician mentioned a previous occasion when sparking had burnt through a cable and not blown the fuses.  Dr W M Thornton, Professor of Electrical Engineering at Armstrong College was then called as a witness.  He considered three causes but settled on one in particular as the most likely; that a train of coal dust between the terminals of a junction box or switch causes arcing between the terminals which ignited the coal dust causing an explosion within the box.  This explosion raised enough dust to trigger a bigger, fatal, explosion which spread throughout the mine.

The report concluded with a number of recommendations including better mechanical protection of electrical equipment (impact and ingress of gas or dust), trip coils in place of fuses and better cleaning.

Aftermath 
The Tanfield “pitman poet” Tommy Armstrong wrote a lyric, “In Memory of 168 Men and Boys who lost their Lives by the West Stanley Explosion, February 16, 1909”.  This was disseminated via song sheet published by Stanley printer Alex. McKinlay. It recommends that the lyric is sung to the popular music hall melody “Castles in the Air”, a favourite of Armstrong’s. 

A pit-wheel memorial was erected at Chester Road in Stanley. It shows all of the people who died in that incident.  A memorial service was held in 2009 to mark the centenary of the disaster.

Notes

References

Bibliography
 
 .  Shaft details are hyperlinked from this main page.

Further reading
Anderson, M. "Durham mining disasters c.1700-1950s".  Barnsley: Wharncliffe Books, 2008
Forster, E. "The death pit : the untold story of mass death in a mine". Newcastle upon Tyne: Frank Graham, 1969.

External links
Memorial images
Picture gallery from the Northern Echo

1882 in England
Explosions in 1882
1882 mining disasters
1882 disasters in the United Kingdom
April 1882 events
1909 in England
Explosions in 1909
1909 mining disasters
1909 disasters in the United Kingdom
February 1909 events
Coal mining disasters in England
History of County Durham
19th century in County Durham
20th century in County Durham